Siobhán Daly is a British producer and artistic director.

Education
Daly is a graduate of Royal Academy of Dramatic Art (RADA), King's College London and Goldsmiths College, University of London. She attended St Edmund's College boarding school in Ware, Hertfordshire known for being the oldest post-Reformation Catholic school in the UK. She is the granddaughter of Mayor Edward Daly.

Career

Theatre
As Associate Producer at the West End Theatre Royal Haymarket, Daly oversaw the expansion and development of the production company, TRH Productions, including the world premiere of Fatal Attraction alongside producer Robert Fox. Directed by Sir Trevor Nunn and adapted by James Dearden, the production starred Natascha McElhone,  Kristin Davis and Mark Bazeley. Daly actively championed young talent and was a member of the panel for the Masterclass Pitch Your Play initiative in 2013, allowing emerging writers the opportunity to workshop their play and perform on the theatre's stage. She was also a member of Ask an Expert at TheatreCraft in 2013, held at the Royal Opera House and launched by director Jamie Lloyd.

Daly is the Artistic Director and Executive Producer of Grassroots Shakespeare London, the multi Off West End Award nominated company which she established in 2011. In January 2016, Grassroots were announced as the first ever resident theatre company at the Leicester Square Theatre, making them the first resident Shakespeare company in the West End since the RSC and the only permanent resident Shakespeare company in the West End. Their production of Twelfth Night starred Ellie Nunn in her West End Shakespeare debut as Viola and John Pickard as Sir Toby Belch, and was performed as part of Shakespeare 400 in April - May 2016. As part of this, Daly produced a 14-hour live broadcast on Saturday 23 April 2016 in association with the live-stream app Periscope, Twitter and GoPro, with Grassroots' actors performing from 'Dawn til Dusk' in central London, including scenes at Middle Temple, the location of the original performance of Twelfth Night. She subsequently oversaw Grassroots' actors performing speeches with Simon Russell Beale and a private view of the 1623 First Folio, one of the top 5 editions remaining in the world.

The company performed at the Royal Shakespeare Company in Stratford-upon-Avon during the World Shakespeare Festival. In April 2014, Grassroots Shakespeare London celebrated Shakespeare's 450th birthday as the only company performing his work during that period in London's West End with their sold-out production of Othello starring Ian Charleson Award nominee Nari Blair-Mangat as Othello and James Alexandrou as Iago at the Leicester Square Theatre. On the birthday, the cast read sonnets with Damian Lewis at the London Guildhall. The production featured on the BBC World Service's The Why Factor programme.

Daly has worked at the Royal Opera House overseeing collaborations with The Royal Ballet and The Royal Opera on major projects, including the BP Big Screens live broadcasts into Trafalgar Square and throughout the UK, and the International Olympic Committee (IOC)'s Opening Ceremony for London's 2012 Olympics, executive produced by Wayne McGregor and starring Plácido Domingo, Renée Fleming, Bryn Terfel, Paloma Faith and Kate Prince's ZooNation.

Daly was identified as one of Britain's top young commercial producers by SOLT/ TMA, one of only six people selected to train on their Stage One scheme in 2013. She worked, both touring and in the West End, with Edward Snape (The Stage Top 100 Producers 2012 & 2013) on the Olivier Awards winning productions of Goodnight Mister Tom, The 39 Steps and The Ladykillers. She produced the 5 star, sell out Edinburgh Festival hit production of Manfred Karge's Man to Man in 2015.

During the 2013–2014 and 2016-2017 seasons, Daly was a judge for the Olivier Awards, sitting on the Opera Panel.

Film and TV
Daly has worked extensively at the BBC including for BBC Drama Production on the long-running series Casualty and alongside BAFTA winning drama producer and director Pier Wilkie, BBC Events on live outdoor broadcasts and in Commissioning for BBC Daytime. Productions for BBC Events included Live Earth at Wembley headlined by Madonna, working alongside Clarence House for the Concert for Diana at Wembley starring Elton John, Children in Need appeal nights and major events such as The State Opening of Parliament and HM The Queen's Christmas Broadcast.

She was the Executive Producer on the short film, The Same Air, and has worked on numerous commercials and music videos for talent including Franz Ferdinand, Goldfrapp, Kaiser Chiefs, Dizzee Rascal, Daniel Bedingfield, Lily Allen and James Blunt. In 2015, she worked with BAFTA Award winning director Daniel Mulloy on his new film 'Home' starring Jack O'Connell and Holliday Grainger. The film premiered at SXSW Film Festival and was nominated for the Grand Jury Award.

Daly has a background as an actor, having credits including ITV's The Battle of Britain and performing in the 2011 Olivier Award winning production of La bohème at the Soho Theatre in London.

In 2016, Daly was jury selected by BAFTA to join BAFTA Crew, a scheme that identifies the UK's top emerging film and TV talent.

Philanthropy
Daly was the Chair of the English National Opera Young Patrons, supported in her role by Sir Peter Bazalgette during his tenure as Chair of the ENO, and the President, Sir Vernon Ellis.

References

External links
 
 

English theatre managers and producers
Women theatre managers and producers
Living people
People educated at St Edmund's College, Ware
BBC people
Royal Opera House
Alumni of Goldsmiths, University of London
Alumni of RADA
West End theatre
Alumni of King's College London
Year of birth missing (living people)